Sameodes odulphalis is a moth in the family Crambidae. It is found in the Philippines (Luzon).

The wingspan is about 26 mm. The wings are pale orange yellow, the forewings with a small black spot at the base of the cell and a slightly larger spot covering the base of veins 3 and 4. The hindwings have a silvery white inner margin.

References

Moths described in 1927
Spilomelinae